The Ciripicea is a left tributary of the river Checheț in Romania. It flows into the Checheț in Ghilești.

References

Rivers of Romania
Rivers of Satu Mare County